The Velveteria Epicenter of Art Fighting Cultural Deprivation, or Velveteria (and formerly the Velveteria: The Museum of Velvet Paintings) is a museum located in Los Angeles, California, dedicated to velvet paintings. Originally opened in 2005 in Portland, Oregon, the establishment houses hundreds of paintings from Caren Anderson and Carl Baldwin's personal collection of over 2,000 pieces, and is reportedly the only one of its kind. The Velveteria closed in Portland in January 2010 due to financial difficulties and the couple's relocation to Southern California. It was reopened in Chinatown, Los Angeles in 2013.

History

The museum was established by Caren Anderson and Carl Baldwin, California natives residing in Portland. It opened in 2005 at 518 NE 28th Avenue with a $3 admission price.

During the month of May 2008, a collection of works were showcased at Powell's Books. The museum relocated to a larger space, located at 2448 East Burnside Street, in 2008, and increased the admission price to $5. However, rental costs were more than three times higher and in January 2010, Velveteria closed when Anderson and Baldwin relocated to Southern California. According to Anderson and Baldwin, they "never made any real money" from Velveteria, a name they trademarked. The couple wrote a book about the museum, titled Black Velvet Masterpieces: Highlights from the Collection of the Velveteria Museum.

In December, 2013, Velveteria re-opened as the Velveteria Epicenter of Art Fighting Cultural Deprivation in Los Angeles. The cost of admission is $10 as of 2017. In 2019, the Velveteria was facing financial difficulties again.

Description

Velveteria was originally located in an "incongruously bland-looking storefront" on East Burnside Street. Leading to the museum were "hot-pink crushed" velvet curtains. The entrance had a sign describing the museum as "a life-changing experience! Without crawling over broken glass or walking on hot coals!" The museum housed 400 velvet paintings from the couple's personal collection of more than 2,000 pieces. No items were for sale. The first location included a "Nudes Room". Some works were displayed within a black light room. Handwritten comments from the couple were displayed throughout the museum.

Works depict blessed virgins, landscapes, sad clowns and "voluptuous" nude women. Unicorn Combover portrayed a unicorn whose mane morphed into a woman's hairdo. The museum included a shrine to Michael Jackson; other portrait pieces depicted Anderson Cooper, Jesus, Abraham Lincoln and Elvis Presley.

Reception
Velveteria was featured on The Tonight Show with Jay Leno in September 2006, Anthony Bourdain: No Reservations in January 2007, and CBS News Sunday Morning and MSN's Appetite for Life with Andrew Zimmern in 2009. In 2010, Kristi Turnquist of The Oregonian wrote that Anderson and Baldwin personified the "Keep Portland Weird" slogan and that the museum was "evidence of the city's quirky creativity". Anderson admitted to being tired of this association.

See also
 Glossary of textile manufacturing
 List of museums in Oregon

References

External links

 Velveteria's official site 

2005 establishments in Oregon
2010 disestablishments in Oregon
2013 establishments in California
Art museums and galleries in California
Art museums and galleries in Oregon
Museums established in 2005
Museums in Los Angeles
Museums in Portland, Oregon

ja:ベルベット・ペインティング